Canon Sportif de Yaoundé, commonly known as Canon Yaoundé, is a Cameroonian association football club based in the capital city of Yaoundé. The club was formed in 1930 and play their games at Stade Ahmadou Ahidjo. Their most successful period was in the 1970s and 1980s when they were a dominant force in Cameroonian and African football, winning eight national championships, eight Cameroonian Cups, three African Champions' Cups and one African Cup Winners' Cup.
.They have as arch-rivals Tonnerre Kalara Club (le"TKC") of Yaounde and Union Sportive de Douala all being great pioneers to Cameroonian football and it's golden age in African club competitions. Canon and Tonnerre form the famous Yaounde derby and hold rich history being that TKC was noted to be a breakaway faction of Canon. The team was host to top players like Theophile Abega, Jean-Paul Akono future coach of gold medal-winning indomitable lions team at the Sydney 2000 Olympic games. The team was absent from top flight national and international football for quite a while due to administrative instability but has been making significant desire for the MTN Elite One title as of the seasons 2020/21& 2021/22 with the recent readjustments made within its administration and finances.

Recent seasons

Key
 League: P = Matches played; W = Matches won; D = Matches drawn; L = Matches lost; F = Goals for; A = Goals against; Pts = Points won; Pos = Final position;
 Cup / International: PR = Preliminary round; QR = Qualifying round; IR = Intermediate round; R1 = First round; R2 = Second round; GS = Group stage; QF = Quarter-final; SF = Semi-final; RU = Runner-up; W = Competition won;

Honours

Domestic
Elite One: 10
1970, 1974, 1977, 1979, 1980, 1982, 1985, 1986, 1991, 2002

Cameroonian Cup: 12
Winners: 1957, 1967, 1973, 1975, 1976, 1977, 1978, 1983, 1986, 1993, 1995, 1999
Runners-up (5): 1960, 1974, 1980, 1985, 1998

Super Coupe Roger Milla: 0
Runners-up (2): 1999, 2002

Continental
CAF Champions League: 3
 1971, 1978, 1980

African Cup Winners' Cup: 1
Winners: 1979
Runners-up (3): 1977, 1984, 2000

Notable coaches
 Oscar Eyoum (1992–95)
 Bienvenu Lessomo (2009–10)

References

External links
Classic Clubs: Canon de Yaoundé at FIFA.com
Canon Kpakum Yaoundé fansite

 
Football clubs in Cameroon
Association football clubs established in 1930
Sport in Yaoundé
1930 establishments in French Cameroon
Sports clubs in Cameroon
CAF Champions League winning clubs
African Cup Winners Cup winning clubs